Volume One is the debut album by the American band Sleep. Not long after Sleep's formation, the band went to Razor's Edge studios to start recording. It was the only album recorded with original guitarist Justin Marler, before he would depart from the band in fall 1991 to become an Orthodox monk. Volume One showcases a darker sound and stronger doom metal influence than Sleep's later work. The image featured on the cover is taken from the Salvador Dalí painting "Soft Self-Portrait with Fried Bacon".

"The Suffering", "Anguish" and "Scourge" are all re-recordings from the band's days as Asbestosdeath. Volume One would be released sometime in 1991 on CD, Vinyl and Cassette. "Scourge" would be omitted from the cassette and vinyl versions of the album.

The vinyl edition of the album would remain out-of-print for years until it was reissued in 2014.

Track listing

Credits
Chris Hakius - drums
Luke Cisneros - bass guitar, vocals
Matt Pike - guitar, vocals
Justin Marler - guitar, vocals

References

1991 debut albums
Sleep (band) albums